Professional development is learning to earn or maintain professional credentials such as academic degrees to formal coursework, attending conferences, and informal learning opportunities situated in practice. It has been described as intensive and collaborative, ideally incorporating an evaluative stage. There is a variety of approaches to professional development, including consultation, coaching, communities of practice, lesson study, mentoring, reflective supervision and technical assistance.

History 
The University of Management and Technology notes the use of the phrase "professional development" from 1857 onwards.

In the training of school staff in the United States, "[t]he need for professional development ... came to the forefront in the 1960s".

Participants
A wide variety of people, such as teachers, military officers and non-commissioned officers, health care professionals, lawyers, accountants and engineers engage in professional development. Individuals may participate in professional development because of an interest in lifelong learning, a sense of moral obligation, to maintain and improve professional competence, to enhance career progression, to keep abreast of new technology and practices, or to comply with professional regulatory requirements. Many American states have professional development requirements for school teachers. For example, Arkansas teachers must complete 60 hours of documented professional development activities annually. Professional development credits are named differently from state to state. For example, teachers in Indiana are required to earn 90 Continuing Renewal Units (CRUs) per year; in Massachusetts, teachers need 150 Professional Development Points (PDPs); and in Georgia, teachers must earn 10 Professional Learning Units (PLUs). American and Canadian nurses, as well as those in the United Kingdom, have to participate in formal and informal professional development (earning credit based on attendance of education that has been accredited by a regulatory agency) in order to maintain professional registration.

Professional school
A professional school is a graduate school level institution that prepares students for careers in specific fields. Some of the schools also offer undergraduate degrees in specific professions. Examples of this type of school include:
architecture school, business school, divinity school, engineering school, journalism school, law school, library school, schools of education (normal school), public policy school and social work school. The field of healthcare has many professional schools, including medical school, chiropractic school, dental school, pharmacy school, physician assistant school, physiotherapy school, podiatric medical school, public health school, speech–language pathology school, occupational therapy school, nursing school, veterinary school and optometry school.

Approaches
In a broad sense, professional development may include formal types of vocational education, typically post-secondary or poly-technical training leading to qualification or credential required to obtain or retain employment. Professional development may also come in the form of pre-service or in-service professional development programs. These programs may be formal, or informal, group or individualized. Individuals may pursue professional development independently, or programs may be offered by human resource departments. Professional development on the job may develop or enhance process skills, sometimes referred to as leadership skills, as well as task skills. Some examples for process skills are 'effectiveness skills', 'team functioning skills', and 'systems thinking skills'.

Professional development opportunities can range from a single workshop to a semester-long academic course, to services offered by a medley of different professional development providers and varying widely with respect to the philosophy, content, and format of the learning experiences.  Some examples of approaches to professional development include:

Case Study Method – The case method is a teaching approach that consists in presenting the students with a case, putting them in the role of a decision maker facing a problem  – See Case method.
Consultation – to assist an individual or group of individuals to clarify and address immediate concerns by following a systematic problem-solving process.
Coaching – to enhance a person’s competencies in a specific skill area by providing a process of observation, reflection, and action.
Communities of Practice – to improve professional practice by engaging in shared inquiry and learning with people who have a common goal
Lesson Study – to solve practical dilemmas related to intervention or instruction through participation with other professionals in systematically examining practice
Mentoring – to promote an individual's  awareness and refinement of his or her own professional development by providing and recommending structured opportunities for reflection and observation
Reflective Supervision – to support, develop, and ultimately evaluate the performance of employees through a process of inquiry that encourages their understanding and articulation of the rationale for their own practices
Technical Assistance – to assist individuals and their organization to improve by offering resources and information, supporting networking and change efforts.

The World Bank's 2019 World Development Report on the future of work  argues that professional development opportunities for those both in and out of work, such as flexible learning opportunities at universities and adult learning programs, enable labor markets to adjust to the future of work.

Initial
Initial professional development (IPD) is defined as "a period of development during which an individual acquires a level of competence necessary in order to operate as an autonomous professional". Professional associations may recognise the successful completion of IPD by the award of chartered or similar status. Examples of professional bodies that require IPD prior to the award of professional status are the Institute of Mathematics and its Applications, the Institution of Structural Engineers, and the Institution of Occupational Safety and Health.

Continuing
Continuing professional development (CPD) or continuing professional education (CPE) is continuing education to maintain knowledge and skills. Most professions have CPD obligations. Examples are the Royal Institution of Chartered Surveyors, American Academy of Financial Management, safety professionals with the International Institute of Risk & Safety Management (IIRSM) or the Institution of Occupational Safety and Health (IOSH), and medical and legal professionals, who are subject to continuing medical education or continuing legal education requirements, which vary by jurisdiction.

CPD authorities in the United Kingdom include the CPD Standards Office who work in partnership with the CPD Institute, and also the CPD Certification Service. For example, CPD by the Institute of Highway Engineers is approved by the CPD Standards Office, and CPD by the Chartered Institution of Highways and Transportation is approved by the CPD Certification Service.

A systematic review published in 2019 by the Campbell Collaboration found little evidence of the effectiveness of continuing professional development (CPD).

See also

References

External links

Personal development
Vocational education
Professional ethics